Hoisington USD 431 is a public unified school district headquartered in Hoisington, Kansas, United States.  The district includes the communities of Hoisington, Galatia, Susank, and nearby rural areas.

Schools 
The school district operates the following schools:
 Hoisington High School
 Hoisington Middle School
 Lincoln Elementary
 Roosevelt Elementary

See also
 Kansas State Department of Education
 Kansas State High School Activities Association
 List of high schools in Kansas
 List of unified school districts in Kansas

References

External links
 

School districts in Kansas
Education in Barton County, Kansas